is a railway station on the Takayama Main Line in the city of Hida,  Gifu Prefecture, Japan, operated by Central Japan Railway Company (JR Central).

Lines

Station layout
Sugihara Station has two opposed ground-level side platforms connected by a level crossing. The station is unattended.

Platforms

Adjacent stations

History
Sugihara Station opened on August 20, 1932. The station was absorbed into the JR Central network upon the privatization of the Japanese National Railways (JNR) on April 1, 1987.

Surrounding area

See also
 List of Railway Stations in Japan

External links

Railway stations in Gifu Prefecture
Takayama Main Line
Railway stations in Japan opened in 1932
Stations of Central Japan Railway Company
Hida, Gifu